Margarella pruinosa is a species of sea snail, a marine gastropod mollusk in the family Calliostomatidae.

Description
The shell grows to a height of 14 mm. The imperforate shell has a subglobose-conical shape. It is a little thick and solid. Its color is violaceous. It is ornamented with irregular oblique striae and decussated with evanescent lines, only visible under a lens. The turbinate spire is prominent. The minute, shining apex is subacute. The 5-6 whorls are convex and regularly rapidly increasing. They are separated by impressed narrowly margined sutures. The large body whorl is above sloping, then rounded. It is subcarinated at the periphery and at the aperture scarcely descending. The oblique, shining aperture is lunate, transversely oblong, and obscurely lirate inside. The acute peristome is simple. Its , margins are subparallel, the outer subsinuous, the basal arcuate, the columellar incurved. The twisted columella is incurved, a little thick, callous, forming an obtuse angle at the base, and emitting a thick, white, shining, slightly dilated callous closing the umbilicus, and bipartite by a longitudinal sulcus.

Distribution
This marine species occurs in the Magellanic Straits, Argentina.

References

External links
 Rochebrune, A.-T. and J. Mabille. 1885. Diagnoses de mollusques nouveaux, recueillis par les membres de la mission du Cap Horn et M. Lebrun, Préparateur au Muséum, chargé d'une mission à Santa-Cruz de Patagonie. Bulletin de la Société Philomathique de Paris (7)9: 100-111
 To Encyclopedia of Life
 To World Register of Marine Species

pruinosa
Gastropods described in 1885